Uncontrollably Fond is a South Korean television series starring Kim Woo-bin and Bae Suzy. It aired from July 6 to September 8, 2016 on KBS2's Wednesdays and Thursdays at 21:55 (KST) time slot.

Synopsis
Shin Joon-young (Kim Woo-bin) and Noh Eul (Bae Suzy) were classmates who were separated during their teenage years due to an ill-fated relationship, but later meet each other in adulthood. Shin Joon-young is now a top actor-singer while Noh Eul is a documentary producer.

Noh Eul had a tough childhood; her father died in a hit-and-run prompting Noh Eul to quit school and make a living for herself and her brother. Shin Joon-young, on the other hand, had his life planned out for him. His mother wanted him to become a prosecutor to follow the footsteps of his estranged father, but an incident caused him to quit law school and become a singer-actor.

The two later reunite when Noh Eul is tasked to film Shin Joon-young's documentary after telling the producer that wanted to shoot the documentary that she can persuade him for giving consent to shoot the documentary. Joon-young initially gives Noh Eul a miserable time before finally agreeing to do the documentary and eventually tries to win her heart back.

Cast

Main

 Kim Woo-bin as Shin Joon-young
 Bae Suzy as Noh Eul
 Lim Ju-hwan as Choi Ji-tae (alias Lee Hyeon-woo)
 Lim Ju-eun as Yoon Jeong-eun

Supporting

People around Shin Joon-young
 Jin Kyung as Shin Young-ok (mother)
 Choi Moo-sung as Jang Jung-shik (Jang Kook-young's father)
 Hwang Jung-min as Jang Jung-ja
 Park Soo-young as CEO Namgoong
 Jung Soo-kyo as Jang Kook-young (Jang Jung-shik's son)
 Jang Hee-ryung as Jang Man-ok

People around Noh Eul
 Lee Seo-won as No Jik (brother)
 Kim Min-young as Ko Na-ri (best friend)
 Park Hwan-hee as teenage Ko Na-ri (episode 2)
 Kim Jae-hwa as Kim Bong-suk (tripe shop owner)
 Lee Won-jong as No Jang Soo (No-eul's father; episode 2)

People around Choi Ji-tae
 Yu Oh-seong as Choi Hyeon-joon (father)
 Jung Seon-kyung as Lee Eun-soo (mother)
 Ryu Won as Choi Ha-roo (sister)

People around Yoon Jeong-eun
 Jung Dong-hwan as Yoon Sung-Ho

Special Appearance
 Lee Jun-ho
 Lee Yu-bi
 Lee Jin-kwon as Cameo
 Kim Young-kwang
 Kim Min-jae

Production

Filming began on November 26, 2015 at Kyungnam University in Changwon, South Gyeongsang Province, South Korea; and finished on April 12, 2016.

The series reunited Kim Woo-bin and Lim Ju-eun who both starred in the hit drama The Heirs and Bae Suzy, Lee Yu-bi, Jin Kyung and Kim Ki-bang who starred in the historical drama Gu Family Book.

Original soundtrack

The original soundtrack of Uncontrollably Fond was divided into two volumes: Volume 1 consists of songs from Parts 1 to 8 and Midnight Youth's Golden Love from Part 14 (also known as the pop OST), while Volume 2 consists of songs from Parts 9 to 15 and tracks by New Empire from Part 14.

Part 1

Part 2

Part 3

Part 4

Part 5

Part 6

Part 7

Part 8

Part 9

Part 10

Part 11

Part 12

Part 13

Part 14 (Uncontrollably Fond Pop OST)

Part 15

Charted songs

Ratings

Awards and nominations

References

External links

  
 
 
 

Korean Broadcasting System television dramas
2016 South Korean television series debuts
2016 South Korean television series endings
South Korean romance television series
South Korean melodrama television series
Television shows written by Lee Kyung-hee
Television series by IHQ (company)
Television series by Samhwa Networks
South Korean pre-produced television series
Korean-language television shows